La Frette may refer to:

La Frette, Isère, a commune in the French region of Rhône-Alpes
La Frette, Saône-et-Loire a commune in the French region of Bourgogne
La Frette-sur-Seine, a commune in the French region of Île-de-France